Aretas II (Nabataean Aramaic: 
 Ḥārīṯat;  Arétās) was the King of the Nabateans. Succeeding Rabbel I, his reign began in 103 BCE and he ruled until 96 BCE. Aretas II was a contemporary of the Hasmonean king Alexander Jannaeus, whose expansionist policies were a direct threat to the Nabatean Kingdom. During the siege of Gaza by Jannaeus in 99, the besieged Gazans requested help from "Aretas, King of the Arabs", but he did not come to their aid and the city was destroyed. Aretas is credited with beginning Nabatean minting.

See also
 List of rulers of Nabatea

References

Bibliography

2nd-century BC Nabataean monarchs
1st-century BC Nabataean monarchs
2nd-century BC Arabs
1st-century BC Arabs